Historic Westville is a history museum representing a 19th-century Georgia town in Columbus, Georgia, United States.

Westville is a re-creation of a historic village with 17 furnished antebellum buildings. In the future, 14 more will be moved to their new site. The buildings were moved onto the museum site in Columbus to create an authentic village environment. Westville preserves, demonstrates, and interprets the life and culture of 19th century South Georgia.  This is accomplished by maintaining an authentic village environment, collecting and preserving artifacts, demonstrating traditional work skills, and workshops and special events.  Every day, "townspeople" in period dress demonstrate woodworking, dressmaking, blacksmithing, and other skills from the mid-19th century.  Buildings include a courthouse, churches, stores, craft shops, and residences.

Westville moved to Columbus, Georgia from Lumpkin, Georgia and re-opened June 22, 2019.

Brief history of John Word West
The history of Westville is connected to Lt. Col. John Word West, a history professor at North Georgia College in Dahlonega.  West was born in 1876 at a critical time of change in Georgia due to dramatic economic and social changes caused by the recent American Civil War (1861–65). Also, the great changes were brought on by the new growth of Atlanta and the subsequent decline of farming.  As a child West spent many hours listening to his grandparents talk about the old way of life that was disappearing.  West listened intently and absorbed the stories and learned the old skills.  Later he would convert those experiences into his own museum where he preserved those stories and old skills.  A high school and college teacher, West committed himself and his own money in 1928 to saving "Georgiana" - the buildings, tools, furniture, and work skills of Georgia's settlement. He admired the work of two other Americans who also took history into their own hands: Rockefeller and Ford. John D. Rockefeller, Jr. (Standard Oil Company) had started Colonial Williamsburg in Virginia in 1927. Henry Ford (automobile maker) had started Greenfield Village in Dearborn, Michigan in 1928. West engaged both men for advice and may have  even traded artifacts with Ford.

Then, in 1928 John West opened "The Fair of 1850" on old Highway 41 in Jonesboro, Georgia, about twenty miles south of Atlanta. For West, the Fair was the Deep South version of Williamsburg and Greenfield Village. From 1932 to 1934, he moved the oldest buildings in his collection to the Fair's site. One of those buildings he moved to Jonesboro was his grandparents log house that he spent so much time in as a youth.  Perhaps just as importantly, he and others demonstrated the "old-fashioned" crafts for the visitors - woodworking, cloth-making, open-hearth cooking, shoe-making, and the like.

West's cause was greater than his teacher's salary. It also turned out to be larger than the vision of Georgia's political leadership. West tried and failed to get the State to take over his project before he died in 1961.

Westville's Lumpkin Era

However, the Fair was far from finished. Its rescue came from deep within rural Georgia and not from state government in Atlanta. Five years after West's death, the citizens of Stewart County decided to create a new industry---heritage tourism.  Stewart County was at the time making a transition away from its traditional agricultural economy. The county still had many buildings and artifacts from the pre-Civil War days. It also had people who had grown up with the handicrafts that West loved. In some respects, then, the Stewart County of 1850 still existed in 1966.

The salvation of the West collection came from a colleague who know John West, and probably spent time as a youth at his Fair of 1850 - Dr. Joseph Mahan, curator of the Columbus Museum of Arts and Crafts (now Columbus Museum).  Mahan took on the saving of West's legacy as his personal mission.  Over dinner one evening at the Singers, Mahan explained the West Collection and his vision for the creation of a village where historic houses could be moved and saved, historic crafts and trades performed, and employ locals in the process.  With much encouragement and leadership from Joseph Mahan, he received for the museum the donation of 59 acres of land on the south side of Lumpkin.  Thus the establishment of Westville Historic Handicrafts in June, 1966.

By 1969, the new museum had purchased the West Collection and opened to the public in Spring 1970.  The six oldest buildings at the Jonesboro site were moved to Westville, along with many West artifacts. The rest of the collection has been assembled mostly by donation from many different people.  In 2001 Westville Historic Handicrafts became Historic Westville with the goal of expanding interpretation from handicrafts to interpreting living history, demonstrations and crafts while telling the story of west Georgia history.

Westville's executive board chairman, Tripp Blankenship, had been seriously considering moving the living history museum to Columbus, Georgia. A protest against the plan was staged on October 23, 2014. As of July 2016, the Lumpkin site was closed.

New site
Historic Westville reopened on June 22, 2019 in Columbus, GA. The site is open Wednesday-Sunday to the public and offers school programs and field trips. Plans to expand interpretation and move other buildings from the Lumpkin site are being set in motion as funding allows.

Today, John West's contribution is appreciated in a larger context. With the exception of a few years in the 1960s, West's project has demonstrated "Georgiana" to the public continuously since 1928. Historic Westville therefore can rightly claim to be rooted in the third-oldest living-history project in America. Westville remains the lasting legacy of John West.

As of October 2019, Historic Westville has live demonstrations and crafting interpreters every day. They are dressed in clothing accurate for the time of 1840-1860. Their living historians engage the public with dialogue about living in South Georgia during the 19th century. Emphasis lies on the unique and diverse stories of the people that made the area of South Georgia their home.

Historic Westville currently has five interpreters that are skilled in traditional trades. Leatherworking and boot making are shown in the Singer Boot Shop, while South Georgia quilting is in the Singer House. Traditional carpentry is in West Wood Shop, while Blacksmithing is in the Woodruff Blacksmith Shop. Westville is also home to a dressmaker that hand stitches all of the clothing worn by employed interpreters at the site. Open hearth cooking will be available early winter 2019. Historic methods and techniques are used by the craftspeople. Tools from the time period are on display in the houses and occasionally, still used.

See also

 List of museums in Georgia (U.S. state)

References

External links
 Official website of Westville

1966 establishments in Georgia (U.S. state)
Living museums in Georgia (U.S. state)
Open-air museums in Georgia (U.S. state)
Museums established in 1966
Museums in Stewart County, Georgia
Rural history museums in Georgia (U.S. state)